The Super League (officially known as the Betfred Super League due to sponsorship from Betfred and legally known as Super League Europe), is the top-level of the British rugby league system. At present the league consists of twelve teams, of which eleven are from  Northern England, reflecting the sport's geographic heartland within the UK, and one  from southern France.

The Super League began in 1996, replacing the existing First Division and, significantly, switching from a traditional winter season to a summer season.

Each team plays 27 games between February and September: 11 home games, 11 away games, Magic Weekend and an additional 4 'loop fixtures' decided by league positions. The top six then enter the play-off series leading to the Grand Final which determines the champions. The bottom team is relegated to the Championship.

In a recent tradition, the Super League champions play the National Rugby League champions from Australasia in the World Club Challenge at the start of the following season.

History

Background
During the 1950s, British rugby league experienced a boom in popularity. However the twenty years that followed saw attendances and popularity decline. A ‘Super League’ was first suggested as far back as the 1970s as a way to address the decline. By the early 1990s the sport was still struggling with dwindling attendances, poor facilities and was dominated by one club Wigan who were the only full time professional team.

By 1992 then Chief Executive of the Rugby Football League, Maurice Lindsay brought up a serious idea for a Super League. He wanted the new league to break the stereotype of rugby league being a sport only played in Northern England and had a vision for clubs to play out of new facilities under a set of minimum standards in an unpublished document he called ‘Framing the Future’.

1990-1996: Establishment
Lindsay’s Super League was given a boost during the mid 90s Australian Super League war. A Rupert Murdoch backed Super League in Australia was trying to gain broadcasting supremacy over the Australian Rugby League. In an attempt to gain the upper hand, Murdoch, whose broadcasting company bSkyb already had the rights to the First Division, approached the RFL.

A £77 million offer and an £87 million payment aided the decision. It was agreed a 14 team Super League would take place in 1996, switching the sport from winter to summer and making every team full time.

As part of the agreement, Super League would be a European competition to break free from its Northern stereotype. Rugby league held a traditional heartland in the South of France and so Toulouse Olympique were invited. A second club from the French leagues was also planned to be invited but the French government refused their backing unless there was a team from Paris, thus Paris Saint Germain were founded as the second French club playing under the same name and colours as the football club.

As well as two French clubs being involved, several merges between English clubs were put forward:
Castleford, Wakefield Trinity and Featherstone Rovers would form Calder
Hull F.C. and Hull Kingston Rovers would form Humberside
Salford and Oldham were to form Manchester
Sheffield Eagles and Doncaster were to form South Yorkshire
Warrington and Widnes were to form Cheshire
Whitehaven, Workington Town, Barrow and Carlisle would form Cumbria
The proposal to merge neighbouring clubs, many who were local rivals and had been part of communities for a hundred year proved unpopular. On Good Friday 1995 it was announced Toulouse had pulled out and Widnes had their own place alongside Warrington, this as well as anti merger campaigns and debates in parliament effectively killing any change of mergers happening.

The first major change before the Super League happened in the 1994-95 season. It was decided the teams finishing in the top ten of the First Division would be in the Super League. Teams finishing 11-15 would be relegated to the Second Division while the bottom team would be relegated to the new Third Division. In the current Second Division the top 7 teams would remain while the rest would make up the Third Division.

Controversy occurred at the end of 1994-95 when Keighley won the Second Division but were denied promotion due to fourth placed London Broncos being fast tracked to the First Division as Lindsay wanted Super League to have a more national coverage. This resulted in a legal challenge from Keighley and Widnes who were both denied a place in Super League.

The 1995-96 season would be the last to be played in winter and fittingly was the sports centenary year. The season was kept short, starting in August and finishing in January while the 1995 World Cup taking place in October.

1996-1997: First seasons
Super League finally kicked off in 1996 with the 12 founding teams being:

 Bradford Bulls
 Castleford Tigers
 Halifax
 Leeds Rhinos
 London Broncos
 Oldham Bears
 Paris Saint-Germain
 Sheffield Eagles
 St. Helens
 Warrington Wolves
 Wigan Warriors
 Workington Town

Along with the new league, new rules were introduced. Squad numbers were adopted, a video referee was at every televised game and the salary cap was introduced to stop clubs overspending and to allow for a more level playing field. Super League was also more Americanised with clubs adopting nicknames and the league seasons copying the NFL Super Bowl by being known as a Roman numeral rather than year (e.g. Super League 1996 was known as Super League I).

The first game was on 29 March which saw PSG beat Sheffield 30-24 in front of 17,873 people at Charlety Stadium. The inaugural Super League title was won by St Helens, breaking Wigan’s stronghold for the first time since 1989 while Workington were relegated.

St Helens were unable to defend their title as Super League's second season was won by the Bradford Bulls with London Broncos justifying the decision to be fast tracked into Super League by finishing second. Oldham were relegated and PSG, who had finished 11th for the second consecutive time were dissolved after it was discovered some of their overseas players had tourist visas to avoid paying French tax.

1998-2005: Grand Final and expansion
Due to Oldham being relegated and PSG folding, two teams, Hull Sharks and Huddersfield Giants, were promoted. It was also announced ahead of the 1998 season that there would be no relegation as the league planned to expand to 14 teams from 1999.

The other major change was that a playoff would decide the Champions. This was not new to rugby league as a playoff system had been in use for most of the sports existence although one hadn’t been used since 1973. Confusingly a playoff did take place at the end of the season but was separate from the official league season and thus didn’t count towards anything. Old Trafford the venue for the old Premiership Playoff Final would be used to host the new Grand Final in which the top five Super League teams would contest.

The first Grand Final took place at Old Trafford in front of a sellout crowd of 40,000 who watched Wigan defeat Leeds 12-8, their first league title since the old First Division.

Ahead of the expansion to 14 clubs Wakefield Trinity were promoted from the Second Division and a new club, Gateshead Thunder were awarded a place in Super League in 1999, which was won by St Helens who beat Bradford in the Grand Final.

Gateshead had a successful debut season on the field finishing tow points off the playoffs however off the field the club was suffering financial difficulties. By the end of the season Gateshead announced they would merge with Hull Sharks who were to revert to being known as Hull FC. Gateshead weren’t the only club struggling, Sheffield announced they could no longer continue and merged with Huddersfield and would be known as Huddersfield-Sheffield Giants. Due to these two clubs resigning from the league it was agreed Super League would revert to 12 teams after just one season.

Relegation was reintroduced in 2001 with one team going down each year. The only major change to the league was in 2002 when the playoffs were expanded to six teams. The League Leaders Shield was introduced in 2003 to reward the team who finished top at the end of the regular season.

In 2005 it was announced a franchise was to be awarded to a French club, with Toulouse,  Villeneuve and Catalans Dragons all applying. In the end Catalans, who were only founded in 2000 after a merger between two Perpignan based clubs, were chosen. Their debut season would be in 2006 and they would be exempt from relegation for the first three years. Their inclusion in Super League meant two clubs would be relegated in 2005. Bottom team Leigh were relegated with 11th placed Widnes.

2005–2013: Licensing

By the mid 2000s Super League hadn’t exactly become what people hoped it would. Standards on the field had improved and attendances increased but many clubs still played out of crumbling stadiums and most of the sport was still played in the North of England. There was also the emergence of the ‘Big Four’ (Bradford, Leeds, Wigan & St Helens) who were dominating the league during its first 10 seasons.

In May 2005 to try and combat the issues facing Super League, the RFL announced licences were announced as the new determinant of the Super League competition's participants from 2009 with relegation scrapped, two new teams would expand the league to 14. The licences were awarded after consideration of more factors than simply the on-the-field performance of a club. After 2007 automatic promotion and relegation was suspended for Super League with new teams to be admitted on a licence basis with the term of the licence to start in 2009.

The RFL stated that clubs applying to compete in Super League would be assessed by criteria in four areas (stadium facilities, finance and business performance, commercial and marketing and playing strength, including junior production and development) with the final evaluations and decisions being taken by the RFL board of directors.

Successful applicants were licensed for three years of Super League competition and three-yearly reviews of Super League membership took place to ensure ambitious clubs lower down the leagues can still be successful.

Points attained by each club's application are translated into licence grades A, B or C. Clubs who achieved an A or B Licence would be automatically awarded a place in the Super League, while those who achieved a C Licence underwent further scrutiny before the RFL decided who made the final cut.

First licensing period

In June 2008, the RFL confirmed that the Super League would be expanded from 12 teams to 14 in 2009 with the playoffs also expanding to 8 teams, and on 22 July 2008 the RFL confirmed the teams awarded licences. The teams announced were the 12 existing Super League teams along with National League 1 teams, Celtic Crusaders and Salford. Celtic Crusaders becoming the first Welsh team to play in Super League and the only team to be awarded a licence who had never played in the Super League previously.

Featherstone Rovers, Halifax, Leigh and Widnes all failed to attain a licence. Leigh and Widnes, especially, were disappointed with their exclusions with Leigh's chairman being extremely critical of the RFL.

By the end of the 2008 season, Salford and Celtic Crusaders finished 13th and 14th respectively and the Grand Final was won by the League Leaders, Leeds Rhinos for a fourth time. The following season Crusaders made the playoffs but were knocked out in the first round. League Leaders Wigan won the Grand Final.

By 2011 the Crusaders were suffering financial difficulties and entered administration and were deducted four points. Salford on the other hand despite never making the playoffs in the three years since they were promoted were in a much better financial position.

During this period the league was being dominated by Leeds and St Helens with Leeds winning 3 titles and St Helens appearing in every Grand Final.

Second licensing period

For the 2012–14 seasons Championship sides Batley, Barrow, Featherstone Rovers, Halifax and Widnes all met the on-field criteria needed to submit an application, but despite this only Barrow, Halifax and Widnes decided to submit an application. On 31 March 2011 Widnes were awarded a Super League licence; Barrow, did not meet the criteria and were refused a licence; and Halifax's application was to be further considered alongside the other Super League clubs.

The Rugby Football League's final decision was announced on 26 July 2011, Widnes would be joining thirteen existing Super League teams with Crusaders having withdrawn their application and Halifax being refused a license. Crusaders CEO Rod Findlay stated that the club's finances were not in a good enough condition to justify their place in Super League. Halifax chairman Mark Steele was critical of the decision to award Wakefield a licence over themselves, saying "If you compare Belle Vue with the Shay, it's no contest; if you compare playing records, it's no contest; and if you compare the financial position, we have kept our head above water and they haven't." Wakefield had been favourites to lose their licence before Crusaders' withdrawal.

2013–2018: Super 8s

After two licensing periods the system started to fall out of favour. Some highlighted the failure of clubs such as Wakefield and Castleford to build new stadiums but were twice awarded licenses over Championship clubs who many thought would be better suited to Super League. There was also unrest in the Championship with clubs feeling their success on the pitch should be rewarded.

At the 2013 Annual General Meeting in Bradford, the Super League clubs agreed to reduce the number of clubs to 12 from 2015, and also for a return of Promotion and Relegation with a 12 club Championship.

A radical new league structure was proposed. The 12 Super League and 12 Championship clubs would play each other home and away over 22 rounds, plus a Magic Weekend for both divisions, making a 23-game regular season. Following the conclusion of their regular league seasons, the 24 clubs then competed in a play-off series where they split into 3 leagues of 8 based upon league position:
The top 8 Super League clubs continued to compete in the Super 8s. After playing each other once (either home or away), the top 4 clubs progressed to the semi-finals to determine who competed in the Grand Final to be crowned champions.
The remaining (bottom 4) Super League clubs and the top 4 Championship clubs competed in The Qualifiers. They played each other once (either home or away) to determine which four of the clubs would compete in Super League the following year.

Funding for clubs was tiered in both leagues to prevent relegation-related financial difficulties.

In preparation for the new structure, two clubs would be relegated from Super League in 2014 to reduce the league to 12. By the end of the season London Broncos and four time Champions Bradford Bulls were relegated to the Championship.

In June 2015 8 of the 12 Super League clubs voted to allow a Marquee Player that could exceed a club's salary cap as long as they can afford their wages. The marquee player rule came into force for the 2016 Super League season.

The first Super 8s season was won by the Leeds Rhinos, with all four Super League clubs surviving the Qualifiers. The following year Hull KR were relegated when they lost to Salford in the Million Pound Game with Leigh being promoted.

2017 saw Castleford finish top of the league for the first time in their history although they eventually lost the Grand Final to Leeds who claimed their 8th title.

By 2018 there were question marks over how successful the Super 8s were. Attendances after the split dropped and there was more interest in relegation than there was in the Super League 8s and playoffs.

2019–2021: Split from RFL and COVID-19 Pandemic
On 14 September 2018, an EGM was called to discuss the future of the sport. The Super League clubs were unhappy with the way the RFL was running the sport and wanted more control over future TV deals and sponsorship money. A vote went Super Leagues way and they subsequently split from the RFL while also voting in favour of scrapping the Super 8s in favour of a more traditional league structure with a one up one down system for promotion and relegation.

As a result of the split the Super League appointed former Everton CEO Robert Elstone as Chief Executive. Elstone brought in new branding and new rules such as the shot clock to stop time wasting and golden point extra time in favour of draws.

After a successful 2019 season Elstone success was short lived due to the 2020 season was suspended due to the COVID-19 pandemic in the United Kingdom . The season was temporarily suspended during the national lockdown in which after Toronto Wolfpack did not return to complete the season. There were calls made from Super League clubs for the two executive bodies – Super League and the RFL – to re-amalgamate following the financial difficulties from the pandemic.

As of 14 December 2020, it was decided by unanimous vote that the Leigh Centurions would take the 12th spot in the 26th Super League season, replacing the Toronto Wolfpack who withdrew from the league as a result of financial difficulties caused by the pandemic. This came after the RFL cancelled the Championship 2020 season in response to the pandemic.

In February 2021 Elstone announced he was to resign as Chief Executive of Super League, citing failures to bring outside investment to the league and the effects of the pandemic. Huddersfield's chairman Ken Davy was appointed as temporary Chief Executive until the end of the season. Subsequently the new Sky Sports TV deal for the Super League and lower divisions was cut from £40 million to £25 million per year for the 2022 and 2023 seasons. This again had RFL and Super League officials calling for a realignment of the two governing bodies.

2022-present: Realignment with RFL and IMG investment
On March 22, 2022 at a Special General Meeting it was announced the RFL and Super League were to officially realign after a majority of clubs voted in favour. A new company separate from the RFL was also set up to take care of the commercial side of the sport.

On the 10 May 2022 the RFL announced it had signed a 12 year deal with sports marketing company IMG to maximise the sports growth.

IMG announced that they planned to scrap traditional promotion and relegation in favour of a return to licensing, although it would be slightly different to how it was executed before. 

Clubs across all three divisions would be graded A, B or C. Clubs Graded A would be eligible for Super League and be immune from relegation with the rest of Super League being made up of the highest ranking Grade B clubs who could be moved between Super League and the Championship depending on how well they were rated. Clubs Graded C would make up the rest of the Championship and League One. The overall goal was to have a Super League with 12 Grade A clubs.

IMG announced grading criteria in March 2023, with clubs being judged on fandom, on field performances, finances, stadium and catchment.

Structure

Super League regular season
12 teams compete in the Super League. They play each other twice on a home-and-away basis, interrupted by the Magic Weekend round in May. The 12 clubs also play 6 loop fixtures to bring the number of games in a season to 27. The team finishing bottom after 27 rounds collects the Wooden Spoon, and is relegated, while the team finishing first is awarded the League Leaders Shield. The top 6 teams at the end of the season enter the playoffs.

Super League adopted Golden point during regular season for the first time in 2019, bringing it in line with the NRL which had been using the system since 2003.

Magic Weekend

In an attempt to expand out of the traditional rugby league "heartlands", and promote the game to a wider audience, the RFL has staged games in large stadiums in places without an existing rugby league presence. The "Magic Weekend" concept, which involves staging an entire round of Super League matches over a weekend in a single stadium, was first staged in Cardiff in 2007. Dubbed "Millennium Magic", and played in the Millennium Stadium, it proved popular with spectators and the concept was held in Cardiff again in 2008. In 2009 and 2010, the event was held in Edinburgh at the Scottish national rugby union stadium, Murrayfield, giving rise to the name changing to "Murrayfield Magic". Generally held during the May Day bank holiday weekend, 2011 saw the Magic Weekend return to Cardiff, and was this time held during the weekend 12–13 February 2011 and served as the season's opening week.  From 2014 to 2018, the event was held at St James' Park in Newcastle.
In 2019, the event was held at Anfield in Liverpool, before returning to Newcastle for the 2020 season.

Play-offs

The play-offs have had various formats. St. Helens are the only team to take part in every play-off series since the inaugural series in 1998.

For 2021 Super League XXVI will use the same six team format used in 2020; comprising three rounds. In round one, the elimination finals, the teams finishing 3rd to 6th play each other with the winners progressing to round two. Round two, the semi-finals, sees the teams finishing 1st and 2nd playing the winners of the two elimination finals. The two winners of the semi-finals meet in the Grand Final.

Grand Final

The Grand Final is the championship-deciding game and showpiece event of the Super League season. It is held annually at Old Trafford, with the exception of 2020 when it was hosted at the KCOM Stadium in Hull in front of no supporters due to the COVID-19 pandemic.

Largest attendance

Other competitions

Challenge Cup

The Challenge Cup is a separate cup competition, involving clubs from Super League and all levels of rugby league in Britain. It has been held annually since 1896 and has been expanded to teams in Canada, Serbia, Ireland, Russia, France, Scotland and Wales can take part. The cup runs throughout the season, and the final is usually played on the August bank holiday at Wembley Stadium. Before Super League began in 1996, the final used to take place at Wembley Stadium at the end of April or the start of May, usually 2 weeks after the regular season ended.

Clubs

Current clubs

Notes
a: Founding member of the Super League
b: Appeared in every Super League season since 1996
c: One of the original 22 RFL teams
d: Includes First Division titles won prior to the inaugural Super League season in 1996.

Former Super League clubs

§ Denotes club now defunct

Teams removed

All Time Super League table

Correct up to end of 2020 season
Table only includes league results and does not include games in playoffs or The Qualifiers

Points deductions

Academies

Reserve league

In 2014 and 2015 Super League clubs were unhappy with the Dual registration system and wanted to form an under-23 reserve leagues between the under-19s and first teams. Wigan, Warrington and St Helens were the first teams to propose the return of the reserve league where players could move from the under 19s and play with professional players before playing in the first team. A reserve league was set up in 2016 with a mixture of Super League, Championship and League 1 teams.

Dual registration

Dual registration refers to an arrangement between clubs whereby a player continues to be registered to his current Super League club and is also registered to play for a club in the Championship. The system is aimed at young Super League players who are thought to be not quite ready to make the step up to 'week in, week out' Super League first team duties but for whom first team match experience is likely to be beneficial for their development.

Only Super League players can be dual registered and the receiving club must be a club in the Championships, meaning that Super League to Super League club dual registrations are not available.
A dual registered player will be eligible to play and train with both clubs in a format agreed between the clubs, subject to registration, salary cap and competition eligibility rules.
The player is restricted to playing in one fixture per scheduled round of fixtures in any given week and would not be eligible to play for his Super League club on a Thursday and in a Championship fixture at the weekend, for example.
A receiving club will be limited to five dual registered players per matchday squad.

Under 19s

In 2017 the following teams will run in each of the Senior Academy divisions:
Super League Academy – U19s:

Bradford Bulls
Castleford Tigers
Catalans Dragons
Huddersfield Giants
City of Hull Academy
Leeds Rhinos
London Broncos

Newcastle Thunder
St. Helens
Wakefield Trinity
Warrington Wolves
Widnes Vikings
Wigan Warriors

Results

Champions

For the first two Super League seasons, Champions were decided by a round robin system. The league format changed in 1998 with a play-off series used to determine the Super League champions for the first since 1972–73.

Results

League Leaders' Shield

The League Leaders' Shield is awarded to the team finishing the regular season top of Super League; this is also known as a minor premiership. The League Leader's Shield was introduced only in 2003, previously no prize was awarded to the team finishing top following the introduction of the Grand Final.

The Double

In rugby league, the term 'the Double' refers to the achievement of a club that wins both the top division and the Challenge Cup in the same season. To date, this has been achieved by ten different clubs in total, six of which occasions have been during the Super League era.

The Treble

The Treble refers to the team who wins all three domestic honours on offer during the season; Grand Final, League Leaders' Shield and Challenge Cup. To date seven teams have won the treble, only Bradford Bulls, St. Helens and Leeds Rhinos have won the treble in the Super League era.

The Quadruple

The Quadruple refers to winning the Super League, League Leaders' Shield, Challenge Cup and World Club Challenge in one season.

Awards

Super League Trophy

The winner of the Grand Final is given the Super League Trophy as Super League Champions. This is considered more prestigious than the minor premiership. Each year, the year of a champion team's triumph, team name and team Rugby league football captain are engraved.

The record for most Super League titles won is held by St Helens with ten titles. Leeds captain Kevin Sinfield currently holds the record for captaining the most Super League title winning sides after captaining Leeds to their first 7 grand final successes. St. Helens contested the final 6 years in a row (from 2006 until 2011) during which time they succeeded only once in lifting the trophy against Hull F.C. in 2006; after which they suffered consecutive defeats against Leeds in 2007, 2008, 2009, Wigan in 2010 and Leeds once again in 2011. However, St. Helens made a victorious return in 2014, defeating rivals, Wigan 14–6 and have since won a further three grand finals, defeating Salford in 2019, Wigan in 2020 and Catalans Dragons in 2021.

Following their  2020 defeat to St. Helens, Wigan have now broken St Helens' record of losing five Grand Finals, losing a total of six. Hull F.C. (2006), Warrington (2012, 2013, 2016, and 2018), Castleford (2017), Salford (2019), and Catalans (2021) have all appeared in the Grand Final but never won.

Steve Prescott Man of Steel award

The Man of Steel Award is an annual award for the best player of the season in Super League. It has continued from pre-Super League times, with the first such award given in 1977. It was renamed in honour of Steve Prescott in 2014.

Albert Goldthorpe Medal

The Albert Goldthorpe Medal is an award voted for be members of the press who cast a vote after every game of the regular season. The three players who, in the opinion of the reporter, have been the three 'best and fairest' players in the game will receive three points, two points and one point respectively. To be eligible for a vote, a player must not have been suspended from the competition at any stage during the season.

Super League Dream Team

Each season a "Dream Team" is also named. The best thirteen players in their respective positions are voted for by members of the sports press.  The 2022 dream team is as follows:

Coaches

Head coaches with Super League titles
The Super League has been won by 15 coaches, 10 from Australia, 4 from England and 1 from New Zealand.

Coaches to have coached at least 200 Super League games
 Bold indicates coach still at club
 Italic indicates coach still active as a head coach in Rugby League but not in Super League at this time

Statistics correct as of 19 March 2023

Players

 Statistics are correct as of 19 March 2023.

Players to have made over 350 Super League Appearances

 Note that appearances from the bench are also included in this list. Excluding appearances in Qualifiers 
 Bold indicates players still active in Super League 
 Italics indicates players still active but not in Super League

Top 5 Super League Try Scorers

Top 5 Super League Points Scorers

Winning captains

11 players have captained teams to win the Super League.

Top Try Scorer by season

Top Points Scorer by season

Logo

The Super League has had three official logos. The first was used from the inaugural season in 1996  until 2016. The logo had the Super League S with Super above it and League below it. The title sponsors name would appear above the logo until 2014 when title sponsors First Utility used their own personalised logos that appeared on player shirts and in the media. The reigning champions had a ribbon around the logo with champions on it until 2011.

The second official logo was introduced in 2017 as part of a radical rebrand across British rugby league. The design was deliberately similar to new Rugby Football League (RFL) and England team logos, in order to maintain a ubiquity of public message. It had a rectangular backdrop representing the George Hotel in Huddersfield (where rugby league was originally founded), thirteen lines representing thirteen players, a chevron (a traditional design feature on many rugby league shirts) and the S which represented the ball and the Super League. The reigning champions had the right to wear a gold version of the logo on their shirts.

Ahead of the 2020 Super League season, a brand new logo was revealed. This was designed by the same company who had recently redesigned the Premier League logo and was more simplistic than previous iterations.

Sponsorship

Super League has been sponsored since its formation, apart from the 2013 season.

The title sponsor has been able to determine the league's sponsorship name. There have been seven title sponsors since the league's formation:

As well as title sponsorship, Super League has a number of official partners and suppliers. For the 2017 season these include Kingstone Press Cider, Dacia, Foxy Bingo, Batchelors and Specsavers.

The official rugby ball supplier is Steeden.

Competition rules

Overseas quota and Federation-trained players
An overseas quota restricting the maximum number of foreign players at each club has existed since the inception of the Super League in 1996. However, overseas players that hold a European Union passport or come under the Kolpak ruling do not count towards the quota. This resulted in the number of non-British players at some clubs greatly exceeding the quota.

In response to concerns over the growing number of foreign players in the league, in 2007, the RFL announced plans to introduce a "homegrown player" rule to encourage clubs to develop their own players. As of 2017, Super League clubs are permitted to register no more than five overseas players. Additionally, squads are also limited to a maximum of seven non-Federation trained players.

Salary cap
A salary cap was first introduced to the Super League in 1998, with clubs being allowed to spend up to 50 percent of their income on player wages. From the 2002 season onwards, the cap became a fixed ceiling of £1.8 million in order to increase parity within the league.

The Super League operates under a real-time salary cap system that will calculate a club's salary cap position at the start of and throughout the season:

The combined earnings of the top 25 players must not exceed £1.825 million.
Clubs will only be allowed to sign a new player if they have room under the cap.
Clubs are allowed to spend a maximum of £50,000 on players outside the top 25 earners who have made at least one first grade appearance for the club during the year.
Costs for players outside of the top 25 earners who do not make a first team appearance will be unregulated.
Any player who has played for the same club for at least 10 consecutive seasons will have half their salary excluded from the salary cap for his 11th and subsequent seasons. This is subject to a maximum of £50,000 for any one club.
Clubs are allowed one "Marquee Player" who can exceed a club's salary cap as long as they can afford the players wages.

In 2017, Super League clubs approved proposals to increase the salary cap over the next three seasons, eventually rising to £2.1 million by 2020. Clubs will also be allowed to sign a second marquee player.

Squad announcement system

Before each Super League fixture, each club must announce the squad of 19 players it will choose from by 2:00pm on the second day before the match day.

Match officials

All Super League matches are governed by the laws set out by the RFL; these laws are enforced by match officials. Former Super League and International Referee Steve Ganson is the current Head of Match Officials and Technical Director. Former Hull F.C. player and Huddersfield Head Coach Jon Sharp was the previous Head of Match Officials. Sharp was sacked in July 2015 and took up the role of Head Coach at Featherstone Rovers. He assumed his role at the RFL following Stuart Cummings' departure in March 2013 having previously held the role of Match Officials Coach & Technical Director.

Criticism

Big Four dominance
Key
Number denotes league position
 

Since its formation in 1996 only four teams have won the Super League (Bradford Bulls, Leeds Rhinos, St. Helens and Wigan Warriors). Also, only nine teams have taken part in the Grand Final (Hull FC, Castleford Tigers, Warrington Wolves, Salford Red Devils, and Catalans Dragons being the other five). Eight teams have been the league leaders, however only one of these (Huddersfield Giants) in 2013, is a different team to those that have appeared in the grand final, meaning that only nine different teams in total have been involved in the grand final or topped the regular season table, however, 23 teams have taken part in Super League since its inception. The last grand final to feature two sides other than Wigan, Leeds, St Helens or Bradford occurred in 1991 when Hull F.C. defeated Widnes 14–4. This had led to the criticism that Super League is effectively uncompetitive, by perpetuating success in the hands of a small number of wealthy clubs.

In comparison, during the same period, 12 different teams have won the Australasian National Rugby League competition and 15 different teams have appeared in the Grand Final.

Licensing
Between 2009 and 2014 teams had to apply for a licence to play in Super League, which was partly awarded based on a club's financial viability; this also meant there was no longer automatic promotion from the Championship into Super League. This was highly unpopular with Championship clubs, because there was no way for them to win promotion to the higher level based purely on sporting success. Consequently, the Super League came to be seen as a closed shop for its existing members, with entry based primarily on financial capability.

Attendances in the lower divisions dropped as a result of this system, because it was felt that there was little appeal in these leagues when there was no incentive for the clubs to win the Championship. Additionally, the only time that lower division clubs got the chance to play illustrious Super League opposition was in the early rounds of the Challenge Cup. With no simple route in to the Super League, teams were further unable to compete with top division opposition because there was no way those clubs could attract good quality talent when they could not offer young players the prospect of playing at the highest level.

M62 Corridor

Most of the teams that have competed in Super League have been in the traditional English rugby league heartlands of the so-called 'M62 Corridor' between Yorkshire and Lancashire. Catalans Dragons are the only team currently playing in Super League who play outside this area. Since their arrival in 2006, The Dragons have enjoyed a sustainable and competitive period in Super League which has seen them become the first non-English team to win the Challenge Cup in 2018, the League Leaders Shield in 2021, and reach the Super League Grand Final, also in 2021.

Expansion of the sport was a key policy of the Rugby Football League when Super League was created, and has consistently been considered important for the future well-being of rugby league. However, with the exception of the Catalans Dragons and the comparative long-term stability of the London Broncos, expansion clubs have not generally proved viable at the highest level. Paris Saint-Germain RL competed from the beginning of the competition but disbanded after just two seasons due to a lack of interest and investment, Gateshead Thunder had poor attendance figures and were merged with Hull after only one year in 1999, despite a strong season that saw them narrowly miss the playoffs, Celtic Crusaders joined Super League in 2009 while in Bridgend, South Wales before moving close to the M62 corridor to Wrexham, North Wales in 2010 and renamed as Crusaders RL. They reached the playoffs in 2010, but struggled on and off the pitch in 2011 before withdrawing their application for a 2012-14 licence at the 11th hour and folding at the end of the season, only lasting 3 seasons in Super League. In addition, Toronto Wolfpack lasted less than a full season in Super League, their financial problems exacerbated by international travel restrictions during the COVID-19 pandemic of 2020 as they pulled out before the resumption of the 2020 season in August 2020 before being expelled from the competition later that year. Toulouse Olympique gained promotion to Super League for the 2022 season, after a victory over Featherstone Rovers on 10 October 2021 in the Million Pound Game, becoming the third French team to play in Super League and the fourth non-British team to play in the competition, as well as ensuring there would be a French derby in Super League for the first time. Toulouse only stayed in Super League for one season, finishing bottom with just 5 wins all season.

Media coverage

Television
Sky Sports have been the primary broadcast partner of Super League since its inaugural season in 1996. The current deal lasts between 2022 until 2023 and covers 66 matches per season, plus gives Channel 4 the right to broadcast a further 10 (eight regular season plus two play-off games). Sky Sports broadcasts live Super League games in both the United Kingdom and Ireland. Broadcasting slots occur on Thursdays and Fridays at 19:30 (20:00 kick off), and varying times on weekend afternoon, however only two or three are used per week.

Source:

Highlights
In addition to Sky Sports' live coverage, BBC Sport broadcast a weekly highlights programme called the Super League Show, usually presented by Tanya Arnold. This is broadcast to the North West, Yorkshire, North East & Cumbria, and East Yorkshire & Lincolnshire regions on BBC One on Monday nights (after 11pm) and is repeated nationally on BBC Two on Tuesday afternoons. A national repeat was first broadcast overnight during the week since February 2008 when the then BBC Director of Sport, Roger Mosey, commented that this move was in response to the growing popularity and awareness of the sport, and the large number of requests from people who want to watch it elsewhere in the UK. The end of season play-off series is shown nationwide in a highlights package. The Super League Show is also available for streaming or download using the BBC iPlayer in the UK.

International
Internationally, Super League is shown live by eight broadcasters in eight countries and regions.

Radio

Talksport is an official broadcaster of Super League, broadcasting commentaries and magazine programming on Talksport 2. BBC Radio 5 Live Sports Extra covers more than 70 Super League games through 5 Live Rugby League each Thursday and Friday night. Each 3 hour programme is presented by Dave Woods with a guest summariser (usually a Super League player or coach) and in addition to live commentary also includes interviews and debate. A 5 Live Rugby League podcast is available to download each week from the BBC website at http://www.bbc.co.uk/programmes/p02nrtxd/episodes/downloads.

Super League is also covered extensively by BBC Local Radio:

The competition is also covered on commercial radio stations:

 Radio Yorkshire cover two matches per round featuring Yorkshire clubs.
BCB 106.6 (Bradford Community Broadcasting) have full match commentary on Bradford home and away.
Wish FM have full match commentary on Wigan and St Helens matches home and away.
Wire FM have full match commentary of Warrington matches home and away.
Grand Sud FM covers every Catalans Dragons Home Match (in French).
Radio France Bleu Roussillon covers every Catalans Dragons Away Match (in French).
All Super League commentaries on any station are available via the particular stations on-line streaming.

Internet
ESPN3, formerly ESPN360, has had worldwide broadband rights since 2007 when they broadcast the 2007 Grand Final.

Since 9 April 2009, all of the matches shown on Sky Sports have also been available live online via Livestation everywhere in the world excluding the US, Puerto Rico, UK, Ireland, France, Monaco, Australia and New Zealand. In 2016 Livestation shut down, however these matches are also available online for UK users only through Sky Go and Now TV.

In the United Kingdom, a number of commercial radio stations, along with BBC Radio 5 Live Sports Extra and the local BBC radio stations simulcast commentary of Super League games on the internet. Additionally, the 5 Live Rugby League podcast is available to download each week from the BBC website at http://www.bbc.co.uk/programmes/p02nrtxd/episodes/downloads.

See also

Super League records
List of current and former Super League venues
Super League Ultimate 13: Grand Final Team
Rugby league in the British Isles
British rugby league system
List of professional sports teams in the United Kingdom

Notes

References

Inline

General

External links

 
 RFL Super League coverage
 Scores from Sky Sports
 Super League News
 RLFANS.COM Rugby League Fans Forum

 
1996 establishments in Europe
Sports leagues established in 1996
Rugby league competitions in the United Kingdom
European rugby league competitions
Professional sports leagues in the United Kingdom
Professional sports leagues in France
Professional sports leagues in Canada
Multi-national professional sports leagues